Ivy Ho Sai-Hong (born 15 August 1958) is a Hong Kong screenwriter and film director.

Ho's work has received high critical acclaim in Hong Kong. Perry Lam of Muse magazine wrote, 'As a writer, Ho excels as a miniaturist. Whether they are the mainlanders trying to survive and prosper in Hong Kong in 甜蜜蜜 (Comrades: Almost a Love Story) or the middle-aged school teacher trying to do the right thing in 男人四十 (July Rhapsody), the characters she creates are keenly observed, psychologically acute portraits. Her tone is intimate and confessional. The many piquant details her stories contain give her characters and the movies in which they appear a solid foothold in reality.'

Filmography

Director

Story

Writer

Awards and nominations

Awards

References

External links
 
 HK cinemagic entry

 

Living people
Hong Kong screenwriters
Hong Kong women writers
Hong Kong film directors
Hong Kong women artists
1958 births